Ceyhun Gülselam (born 25 December 1987) is a Turkish professional footballer who plays as a center back and defensive midfielder. He plays for Altay.

Club career
Gülselam also played eight years for the Bayern Munich Junior Team before joining SpVgg Unterhaching.

Trabzonspor
During the summer of 2008, Ceyhun signed a three-year contract with Trabzonspor. He spent three seasons in Trabzon, before going to Istanbul to play for Galatasaray.

Galatasaray
On 11 June 2011, Galatasaray signed Ceyhun on a free transfer until the end of 2013–14 season. Ceyhun scored his first goal for Galatasaray against his former club Trabzonspor.

On 10 January 2013, he left on loan to Kayserispor for €200,000.

Ceyhun returned to Galatasaray after his impressive loan spell at Kayserispor. However, the club did not seek to extend his contract and he joined Hannover for two years on 24 July 2014.

On 4 January 2018, he joined Osmanlıspor in the Turkish Süper Lig on a free transfer.

On 29 August 2018, he has signed with Alanyaspor.

International career
He has played for the Turkey national under-21 football team. He debuted for the Turkey national football team against Belarus on 26 March 2008.

Career statistics

Club
.

Honours
Trabzonspor
Türkiye Kupası: 2009–10
Turkish Super Cup: 2010

Galatasaray
Süper Lig: 2011–12
Süper Kupa: 2012, 2013
Türkiye Kupası: 2013–14

References

External links

 
 
 
 
 
 

1987 births
Living people
Footballers from Munich
Turkish footballers
Turkey under-21 international footballers
Turkey B international footballers
Turkey international footballers
German footballers
Süper Lig players
Bundesliga players
2. Bundesliga players
TFF First League players
SpVgg Unterhaching players
SpVgg Unterhaching II players
Trabzonspor footballers
Galatasaray S.K. footballers
Kayserispor footballers
Hannover 96 players
Kardemir Karabükspor footballers
Ankaraspor footballers
Alanyaspor footballers
Altay S.K. footballers
Association football midfielders
German people of Turkish descent